Pinellas Park is a city located in central Pinellas County, Florida, United States. The population was 53,093 at the 2020 census. Originally home to northern transplants and vacationers, the hundred year old city has grown into the fourth largest city in Pinellas County, the most densely-populated county in Florida. The city and surrounding areas are almost completely urbanized. Pinellas Park contains a substantial portion of the Gateway area of the county, targeted for future infrastructure, residential, and commercial development as it sits roughly in the middle of the Tampa Bay area's over two million people. Though land-locked, its borders lie only a few miles from Tampa Bay to the east, and Boca Ciega Bay and the Gulf of Mexico to the west. The city is known for its popular equestrian facilities and events, and many residents also participate in fishing and water activities in nearby venues.

History
The city was founded by Philadelphia publisher F. A. Davis, who purchased  of Hamilton Disston's land around 1911. Davies used promotional brochures to lure northerners, especially Pennsylvanians, to the town, noting the pleasant climate in the winter and the agreeable agricultural conditions. The Florida Association, a corporation, set up model farms and offered a free lot in the city with the purchase of ten acres of nearby farm land. A two-story building called the Colony House was established to house perspective purchasers of the available farm plots. The primary crop that the founders intended to grow on the farms they established was sugar cane. By 1912, lots in the city were being sold separately. The City of Pinellas Park was formally incorporated on October 14, 1914.

Though not on the original Orange Belt Railway, Pinellas Park did have a train depot, razed in 1970, on the line between Clearwater and St. Petersburg. The city lay on the vehicle road from St. Petersburg to Tampa. Growth was moderate until after World War II, when the city's population more than tripled.

Geography

Pinellas Park city limits are contiguous with those of St. Petersburg, Clearwater, Largo, Seminole, Kenneth City, and unincorporated areas of Pinellas County. Annexation into the city is voluntary by both the property owner and the City Council.

Because of the city's relatively low elevation between major bodies of water, and its generally flat topography, it has historically been subject to flooding. Through construction of a network of drainage canals and other measures by the Pinellas Park Water Management District, flooding in the city has been greatly mitigated.

Demographics

As of the census of 2020, there were 53,093 people, 20,746 households, and 12,344 families residing in the city. The racial makeup of the city was 77.8% White, 5.1% African American, 0.0% Native American, 9.9% Asian, 0.3% Pacific Islander, and 2.3% from other races and 4.7% of two or more races. Hispanic or Latino of any race were 13.9% of the population. Linguistically, 76.1% of the population over the age of five reported speaking only English at home, while 23.9% reported speaking some other language.

There were 20,746 households, out of which 22.3% had children under the age of 18 living with them, 52.8% were married couples living together, 10.2% had a female householder with no spouse present, 6.6% had a male householder with no spouse present, and 40.4% were non-families. 32.6% of all households were made up of individuals, and 17.6% had someone living alone who was 65 years of age or older. The average household size was 2.54 and the average family size was 3.22.

In the city, the population was spread out, with 20.3% under the age of 20, 10.4% from 20 to 29, 14.3% from 30 to 39, 12.5% from 440 to 49, 20.5% from 50 to 64, and 22.0% who were 65 years of age or older. The median age was 43.6 years. 47.1% of the inhabitants were male and 52.9% were female. Like many areas in Florida, the population of Pinellas Park swells temporarily, but substantially, for half the year as mostly-retired adults (called "snow birds"), who reside elsewhere in the northern states or Canada during the summer, come to Florida for its mild winter climate.

Educational statues surveys showed that among those 25 and older 14.3% did not have a high school diploma, while 32.4% had only a high school diploma, 19.8% had some college experience without a degree, 25.8% had an Associate's or bachelor's degree, and 7.7% had a graduate or professional degree.

The median income for a household in the city was $58,526, and the median income for a family was $58,526. Males had a median income of $44,616 versus $38,510 for females. The per capita income for the city was $18,701. About 9.0% of families and 13.2% of the population were below the poverty line, including 14.8% of those under age 18 and 11.2% of those age 65 or over.

Government
Pinellas Park has a Council-Manager form of government. The current Mayor is Sandra Bradbury, who is the daughter of former Mayor Cecil Bradbury. The current City Manager is Douglas Lewis. Various volunteer citizen boards are appointed by the City Council to advise the council on normal governmental matters. The City Council itself consists of four board members.

Police and Fire Departments
Pinellas Park's original police department was founded on May 27, 1915, with its only member being the appointed Marshal George W. Williams Sr. The modern Police Force was established in 1948.
Today, the city maintains a Police Department of more than 150 employees. Police Chief Mike Haworth in 2015 assumed the position previously held by Dorene Thomas, the first female police chief in the county. The city announced in its 2020 budget that it will being work on a $25 million construction project of a new Police and Fire Operations Center that will last several years.

The Fire Department was established in 1912, when the city had only 50 residents. It serves the city and the surrounding areas. In 2017 the city paid $915,000 for the site of a former church with the intention of building a new fire station. The city has announced construction of the new station will cost approximately $4.7 million.

Youth Programs
The Police Department facilitates the Police Explorers, a youth education and service group. Likewise, the Fire Department facilitates the Fire Explorers. Youth in both programs are involved in community service as well as competitions among similar groups.

Library

Madalya Fagan was the first president of the library association, and through the efforts of this volunteer organization, the Pinellas Park Public Library was established in December 1948. Fifteen years later, the city of Pinellas Park took control over the library. Marjorie Trimble was the very first paid librarian, although it wouldn't be until 1967 when Ms. Harrop would be the first librarian who possessed a Master of Library Science degree to be hired.
The first library building was located in Park Station, an old pump house in the middle of Triangle Park. The second library was then built at 5795 Park Boulevard, although that structure no longer stands. The current library was built in 1969, and is located at 7770 52nd St, across the street from City Hall and Pinellas Park Elementary School. The library was last remodeled in 2001 and has undergone several additions that expanded the original 7,000 square feet interior into 30,972 square feet, which includes over 26 adult desktop computers, 11 children desktop computers, a teen lounge, a quiet room, and two meeting rooms for rentals and programs.

On June 6, 2014, the library was renamed in honor of late director Barbara S. Ponce. Mrs. Ponce was promoted to community activities administrator and library director in 1999, and retired in 2008. The job placed her over the Pinellas Park Library, parks and recreation, and media/public events.

Collection
The library houses a collection of over 100,000 physical items, including books, audio books, newspapers, magazines, DVD's, and Blu-ray discs available for holders of Pinellas Public Library Cooperative-issued library cards to check out. E-books and other digital services are also available. Special collections include an Asian Language Collection with materials in Hindi, Mandarin, and Vietnamese, a Spanish Collection, and an extensive collection of graphic novels and Manga.

Programs
The Barbara S. Ponce Public Library hosts programs for community residents with many designed for children and teens.

These programs include many art, music, and literature related educational programs as well as chess clubs, board game events, and programs to tutor schoolchildren with homework help.

Adult programming consists of monthly craft nights, an adult coloring club, free movie screenings, murder mystery nights, and technology classes. English as a Second Language (E.S.O.L.), American Sign Language, Origami, and Ukulele classes are also hosted by members of the community in conjunction with the library.

Arts and Culture

Fine arts
The Pinellas Park Civic Orchestra and the Sunsation Show Chorus perform regularly in the City-owned 500-seat Performing Arts Center. Regular theatre organ concerts are given at the City Auditorium, home to a "Mighty Wurlitzer" restored by the local chapter of the American Theatre Organ Society. The Pinellas Park Arts Society holds monthly themed contests in the Park Station building, close to the Creative District. To encourage artists to live and work in the district, the city has established two facilities: Studios at 5663 and the Artist Live/Work building.

Automobile culture
The Tampa Bay Automobile Museum displays an extensive collection of historical automobiles with an emphasis on progressive engineering achievement, the personal interest of founder and benefactor Alain Cerf. The museum houses a unique working full-scale replica of the first self-propelled mechanical vehicle, the fardier of Nicolas-Joseph Cugnot. Luxury cars currently displayed and sold in Pinellas Park include Rolls-Royce Motor Cars, Bentley, McLaren, and Aston Martin. These and a  Maserati dealership are all located in the Gateway area near the Automobile Museum.

Car and truck aficionados display their prized vehicles nearly weekly on 49th Street and compete in the regularly scheduled shows. The Showtime Dragstrip provides a venue for drag racing fans. Nearby on the aptly-named Automobile Boulevard is Tampa Bay Grand Prix, where youth and young adults race high-speed go carts on an indoor track.

Community events

Pinellas Park is known throughout the Tampa Bay area for a series of community events held annually in a city-owned bandshell located behind City hall. The most popular of these events is "Country in the Park", a festival held every year generally on the third Saturday of March, but always after the Florida State Fair and Florida Strawberry Festival. The festival's popularity stems from its wide array of events, such as arts and crafts shows, NASCAR displays, popular amusement park rides, and multi-artist day-long concerts, and the fact that parking, entry to the festival, and attendance of the concert are all free of charge. As of 2011, the Country in the Park festival has been organized for 21 years straight.
Another popular celebration among the locals is Pride in the Park. This celebration occurs during the week leading up to Country in the Park. Usually the night before Country in the Park, the firefighters' chili cookoff takes place at the bandshell.

Pinellas Park is home to a memorial to the Korean War, located in Freedom Lake Park.

Education
The city is served by the Pinellas County Schools district. Most of the city's high school students attend Pinellas Park High School or Dixie M. Hollins High School.

The Caruth Health Education Center is home to the healthcare-related degree programs of St. Petersburg College. It includes a simulation hospital unit for its nursing program, a patient-care clinic of dental hygiene, and an orthotics and prosthetics lab space.

Notable people
 Mike Cope, NASCAR driver
 Jesse Litsch, former MLB pitcher for the Toronto Blue Jays
 Browning Nagle, former NFL football player
 Terri Schiavo, resident at a hospice during the case surrounding her end-of-life case
 Melissa Ann Shepard, Canadian-born criminal
 Rachel Wade, an American woman who was convicted of murder in the second degree in the murder of Sarah Ludemann
 Fez Whatley, radio personality

Economy

Due to its proximity to the Gulf of Mexico and Tampa Bay, Pinellas Park is home to many marine businesses, from manufacturing to service and supplies. Large optical manufacturers, including Transitions Optical, are located either in Pinellas Park or nearby in the broader area known as "Gateway".

In 2020 the city reported the unemployment rate of the 'immediate area' at 5.0%. In 2020, the city reported total governmental-type and business-type assets of $271 million and total revenue from taxation and charges for services of $104 million.

Lockheed Martin Aeronautics' Pinellas Park facility specializes in metal forming, fabrication and assembly of components for military and civilian aircraft. Current and prior projects include the F/A-22, F-16, C-130J, C-5, U2, Northrop's E-2C Hawkeye, the Gulfstream G5, Goodrich Aerospace, Piper, the P-3, Atlas Launch Vehicle, Space Shuttle, and B-52 Bomber.

The C.W. Bill Young Armed Forces Reserve Center, a $47-million multi-facility training center for both U.S. Army Reserve and Florida Army National Guard units, opened in 2005 and serves thousands of soldiers yearly.

Several of the largest employers in Pinellas County occupy parcels contiguous with the city, including Raymond James Financial, Transamerica Financial, Cisco, FIS (credit card services), Valpak (advertising mailers), Orbital ATK (defense electronics), and Home Shopping Network.

The city has three concentrations of retail business all along Park Boulevard. At 49th Street, near the historic center of town, one finds traditional shops, small businesses, and restaurants. Just to the east, at U.S. 19, the Shoppes at Park Place anchor the city's second retail hub with big-box retailers and a large movie theater. At the western edge of the city, near 66th Street and Belcher Road, are more big box retailers, ethnic specialty shops and restaurants, and the enormous Wagon Wheel and Mustang flea markets.

Due to the significant Vietnamese, Laotian, Indian, and southeast Asian community, Pinellas Park is home to one of the largest concentrations of ethnic restaurants, businesses, and specialty vendors serving those communities in the southeast. The city's library maintains the county's only special collection of materials in Vietnamese. The population includes those with recent ancestors from Germany, Poland, Eastern Europe, Russia, Armenia, India, Lebanon, Cuba, and Puerto Rico.

The Pinellas Park Chamber of Commerce promotes the interests of local and nearby businesses, contributing to the overall vitality and cooperative nature of the mid-county economy.

Transportation
Pinellas Park is served by major roads such as U.S. Route 19, Florida State Road 693, Florida State Road 694, and is served by an exit off I-275.
 
Mass Transit through Pinellas Park is provided by Pinellas Suncoast Transit Authority (PSTA).

While the Clearwater Subdivision railroad line runs through Pinellas Park, the city contains no stops on the line.

Nearby Tampa International Airport provides air transportation for most passengers. Smaller airlines, with destinations to smaller cities and towns, operate at St. Petersburg-Clearwater International Airport, with most tenants providing only seasonal services.

Gallery

References

External links

 

Cities in Pinellas County, Florida
Cities in Florida
1914 establishments in Florida